Propynylidyne is a chemical compound that has been identified in interstellar space.

Structure

Linear (l-C3H) 

μD=3.551 Debye

2Π electronic ground state

Simulated spectrum 

A rotational spectrum of the 2Π electronic ground state of l-C3H can be made using the PGopher software (a Program for Simulating Rotational Structure, C. M. Western, University of Bristol, http://pgopher.chm.bris.ac.uk) and molecular constants extracted from the literature.  These constants include μ=3.551 Debye and others provided by Yamamoto et al. 1990, given in units of MHz:  B=11189.052, D=0.0051365, ASO=432834.31, γ=-48.57, p=-7.0842, and q=-13.057.  A selection rule of ΔJ=0,1 was applied, with S=0.5.  The resulting simulation for the rotational spectrum of C3H at a temperature of 30 K agree well with observations. The simulated spectrum is shown in the figure at right with the approximate atmospheric transmission overplotted in blue. All of the strongest simulated lines with J < 8.5 are observed by Yamamoto et al.

Cyclic (c-C3H) 

μD=2.4 Debye electronic ground state

Chemistry 

The molecule C3H has been observed in cold, dense molecular clouds.  The dominant formation and destruction mechanisms are presented below, for a typical cloud with temperature 10K.  The relative contributions of each reaction have been calculated using rates and abundances from the UMIST database for astrochemistry.

Dominant formation reactions

Dominant destruction reactions

Contribution to carbon-chain molecule production 

The C3H molecule provides the dominant pathway to the production of C4H+, and thereby all other CnH (n>3) molecules via the reactions:
C3H + C+ → C4+ + H
C4+ + H2 → C4H+ + H

These reactions produce the majority of C4H+, which is necessary for the production of higher-order carbon-chain molecules.  Compared to the competing reaction,
C3H3+ + C → C4H2+ + H, 
also shown right, the destruction of C3H provides a much faster pathway for hydrocarbon growth.

Other molecules in the C3H family, C2H and C3H2, do not significantly contribute to the production of carbon-chain molecules, rather forming endpoints in this process. The production of C2H and C3H2 essentially inhibits larger carbon-chain molecule formation, since neither they nor the products of their destruction are recycled into the hydrocarbon chemistry.

First astronomical detection 

The first confirmation of the existence of the interstellar molecule C3H was announced by W.M Irvine et al. at the January 1985 meeting of the American Astronomical Society.  The group detected C3H in both the spectrum of the evolved carbon star IRC+10216 and in the molecular cloud TMC-1.  These results were formally published in July of the same year by Thaddeus et al.  A 1987 paper by W.M. Irvine provides a comparison of detections for 39 molecules observed in cold (Tk ≅10K), dark clouds, with particular emphasis paid to tri-carbon species, including C3H.

Subsequent astronomical detections 

Later reports of astronomical detections of the C3H radical are given in chronological order below.

In 1987, Yamamoto et al. report measurements of the rotational spectra of the cyclic C3H radical (c-C3H) in the laboratory and in interstellar space towards TMC-1.  This publication marks the first terrestrial measurement of C3H.  Yamamoto et al. precisely determine molecular constants and identify 49 lines in the c-C3H rotational spectrum.  Both fine and hyperfine components are detected toward TMC-1, and the column density for the line of sight toward TMC-1 is estimated to be 6x1012cm−2, which is comparable to the linear C3H radical (l-C3H).

M.L Marconi and A. Korth et al. reported a likely detection of C3H within the ionopause of Comet Halley in 1989.  Using the heavy ion analyzer (PICCA) on board the Giotto spacecraft they determined that C3H was responsible for producing a peak at 37amu detected within ~4500 km of the comet nucleus. Marconi et al. argue that a gas phase progenitor molecule for C3H is unlikely to exist within the ionopause and suggest that desorption from circumnuclear CHON dust grains may have instead produced the observed C3H.

In 1990, Yamamoto et al. detected C3H toward IRC + 10216 using the Nobeyama Radio Observatory's 45-m radio telescope.  They determine an upper limit for the column density of the ν4 state  3x1012cm−2.  From additional laboratory measurements they determine an extremely low vibrationally excited state for the C3H radical: ν4(2Σμ)=610197(1230) MHz, caused by the Renner-Teller effect in the ν4 (CCH bending) state.

J.G. Mangum and A. Wootten report new detections of c-C3H towards 13 of 19 observed Galactic molecular clouds.  They measure relative abundance of C3H to C3H2: N(c-C3H)/N(C3H2) = 9.04±2.87 x 10−2. This ratio does not change systematically for warmer sources, which they suggest provides evidence that the two ring molecules have a common precursor in C3H3+.

L.A. Nyman et al. present a molecular line survey of the carbon star IRAS 15194-5115 using the 15m Swedish-ESO Submillimetre Telescope to probe the 3 and 1.3 mm bands. Comparing the molecular abundances with those of IRC + 10216, they find  C3H to have similar abundances in both sources.

In 1993, M. Guelin et al. map the emission from the 95 GHz and 98 GHz lines of the C3H radicals in IRC+10216.  This reveals a  shell-like distribution of the C3H emission and time-dependent chemistry. The close correspondence between the emission peaks of C3H and the species MgNC and C4H suggests a fast common formation mechanism, suggested to be desorption from dust grains.

Turner et al. survey 10 hydrocarbon species, including l-C3H and c-C3H in three translucent clouds and TMC-1 and L183. Abundances are measured or estimated for each.  The mean cyclic-to-linear abundance ratio for C3H is found to be 2.7, although a large variation in this ratio is observed from source to source.

In 2004, N. Kaifu et al.  completed the first spectral line survey toward TMC-1 in the frequency range 8.8-50.0 GHz with the 45-m radio telescope at Nobeyama Radio Observatory. They detected 414 lines of 38 molecular species including c-C3H and compiled spectral charts and improved molecular constants for several carbon-chain molecules.

Martin et al. made the first spectral line survey towards an extragalactic source, targeting the starburst galaxy NGC253 across the frequency range 129.1-175.2 GHz. Approximately 100 spectral features were identified as transitions from 25 different molecular species, including a tentative first extra-galactic detection of C3H.

References 

Alkynes
Astrochemistry